Nevena Ignjatović (born in Kragujevac, Republic of Serbia, SFR Yugoslavia on 28 December 1990) is a Serbian alpine skier.

She was named to the Serbian team at the 2010, 2014 and 2018 Winter Olympics.

World Cup results

Season standings

Olympic results

World Championship results

References

1990 births
Serbian female alpine skiers
Alpine skiers at the 2010 Winter Olympics
Alpine skiers at the 2014 Winter Olympics
Alpine skiers at the 2018 Winter Olympics
Alpine skiers at the 2022 Winter Olympics
Olympic alpine skiers of Serbia
Universiade medalists in alpine skiing
Living people
Sportspeople from Kragujevac
Universiade gold medalists for Serbia
Competitors at the 2013 Winter Universiade
21st-century Serbian women